Sehnsucht Live is the third live album by German electronical musician, composer and producer Christopher von Deylen under his Schiller alias. The double album features several live versions of the tracks found on the 2008 album Sehnsucht. It was recorded at Palladium in Cologne, during Schiller's 2008 'Sehnsucht Live' tour. Furthermore, CD II holds brand new productions with internationally renowned artists Colbie Caillat and Lang Lang.

Track listing
CD 01:

CD 02:

References

External links 
 

2008 live albums
Schiller (band) albums